The 2015 Emporia State Hornets football team represented Emporia State University in the 2015 NCAA Division II football season. The Hornets played their home games on Jones Field at Francis G. Welch Stadium in Emporia, Kansas, as they have done since 1937. 2015 was the 122nd season in school history. The Hornets were led by head coach Garin Higgins, who finished his fifteenth overall season, and ninth at Emporia State. Emporia State is a member of the Mid-America Intercollegiate Athletics Association.

Previous season
The 2014 Emporia State Hornets football team finished the regular season 4–7, with losses to Central Missouri, Central Oklahoma, Pittsburg State, Fort Hays State, Washburn, Northwest Missouri State and Nebraska–Kearney. Due to the multiple injuries, including the starting quarterback, the Hornets were not ranked and did not make a post-season game, like the previous two years.

Personnel

Coaching staff
Along with Higgins, there are 9 assistants.

Roster

Schedule

Source:

Game notes, regular season

Missouri Southern

Central Missouri

Central Oklahoma

Northeastern State

Lindenwood

Pittsburg State

Fort Hays State

Missouri Western

Washburn

Northwest Missouri State

Nebraska–Kearney

Game notes, post-season

Minnesota State–Mankato

Henderson State

Northwest Missouri State

References

Emporia State
Emporia State Hornets football seasons
Emporia State Hornets football